Lydie Salvayre (born Lydie Arjona in 1948) is a French writer.  Born in the south of France to Republican refugees from the Spanish Civil War, she went on to study medicine in Toulouse and continues to work as a practicing psychiatrist. 

She has been awarded the Prix Hermes, the Prix Décembre for her work, and the 2014 Prix Goncourt for Pas pleurer.

Works
 La Déclaration (1990)
 La Vie commune (1991) - translated into English as Everyday Life (Dalkey Archive Press 2006)
 La Médaille (1993) - translated into English as The Award (Four Walls Eight Windows 1997)
 La Puissance des mouches (1995) - translated into English as The Power of Flies (Dalkey Archive Press 2007)
 La Compagnie des spectres (1997) - translated into English as The Company of Ghosts (Dalkey Archive Press 2006)
 Quelques conseils aux élèves huissiers (1997)
 La Conférence de Cintegabelle (1999) - translated into English as The Lecture (Dalkey Archive Press 2005)
 Les Belles âmes (2000)
 Le Vif du vivant (2001)
 Et que les vers mangent le bœuf mort (2002)
 Contre (2002)
 Passage à l'ennemie (2003)
 La méthode Mila (2005)
 Dis pas ça (2006)
 Lumières sur la CCAS. Les activités sociales des salariés de l'énergie (2006, collective work)
 Portrait de l'écrivain en animal domestique (2007)
 Petit traité d'éducation lubrique (2008)
 BW (2009)
 Hymne (2011)
 7 femmes (2013)
 Pas pleurer (2014, Prix Goncourt); published in English in 2016 by MacLehose Press as Cry, Mother Spain (translated by Ben Faccini).
 ''Marcher jusqu'au soir (2019)

Decorations 
 Commander of the Order of Arts and Letters (2015)

References

People from Loir-et-Cher
1948 births
Living people
French medical writers
French women writers
Prix Décembre winners
Prix Goncourt winners
French people of Spanish descent
French psychiatrists
Commandeurs of the Ordre des Arts et des Lettres
French women psychiatrists